The Maharashtra International Education Board (MIEB) is an autonomous Board established by the State Education department of the Government of Maharashtra, that aims to run Schools across the state, providing high quality Education in Marathi equivalent to International Standards for children in Public Schools.
MIEB is the second board in the state after the Maharashtra State Board of Secondary and Higher Secondary Education. The Board will prepare a syllabus for non-English medium schools, and will compete with the existing boards such as CBSE and ICSE.

See also
 Maharashtra State Board of Secondary and Higher Secondary Education

References

Education in Maharashtra